The Third Eye is a 1920 American crime mystery drama film serial directed by James W. Horne. The film is considered to be lost.

Plot
As described in a film publication, Curtis Steele (Oland), a society man at a film studio, has been pursuing actress Rita Moreland (Percy) and confronts her at the studio with the intention of making love to her. She repulses him and during the struggle shoots him. Steele staggers forward and collapses. She is terrified as she thought that the revolver had been loaded with blanks. As she bends over him, he leaps to his feet and with a sneering remark leaves. Later that night Rita is informed that Steele was found at the studio shot through the heart, and that there is a film showing Steel chasing her and then her shooting him. The serial then develops around Rita, her sweetheart, a villain, and the mystery of who killed Steele, who made the film, and attempts to obtain the film.

Cast
 Warner Oland as Curtis Steele / Malcolm Graw
 Eileen Percy as Rita Moreland
 Jack Mower as Dick Keene
 Olga Grey as Zaida Savoy
 Mark Strong as Detective Gale

Chapter titles
The Poisoned Dagger
The Pendulum of Death
In Destruction's Path
Daggers of Death
The Black Hand Bag
The Death Spark
The Crook's Ranch
Trails of Danger
The Race for Life
The House of Terrors
The Long Arm of Vengeance
Man Against Man
Blind Trails of Justice
At Bay
Triumph of Justice

See also
 List of film serials
 List of film serials by studio

References

External links

allmovie/synopsis; The Third Eye

1920 films
American silent serial films
American black-and-white films
Pathé Exchange film serials
Lost American films
Films directed by James W. Horne
1920s American films
Silent crime films
Silent mystery drama films